Sadreh-ye Seyyed Yaqub (also Romanized as Şadreh-ye Seyyed Ya‘qūb; also known as Sadreh, Sadrehé Yek, Sadreh-ye Yek, Sedreh-ye Yek, and Seyyed Ya‘qūb) is a village in Jahad Rural District, Hamidiyeh District, Ahvaz County, Khuzestan Province, Iran. At the 2006 census, its population was 95, in 22 families.

References 

Populated places in Ahvaz County